Dharmadasa Walpola (Sinhala: ධර්මදාස වල්පොල) (1927–1983) was the most prominent Sri Lankan male playback singer of the 1950s and 1960s. Walpola was an accomplished musician adapt at playing the flute, harmonium, violin and tabla.

Biography

Early life 
Walpola's father Palis Ayya worked with costumes for the Tower Hall theater. Walpola had to forgo his education at a young age to support his family and for a time built masks for the Sri Lankan army. At that time he won a role in Sirisena Wimalaweera's play Amma singing a virindu. He subsequently acted and sang in the play Wessanthara as well.

To master the flute, Walpola began taking lessons from Eddie Master and then attended R. A. Chandrasena's Academy. Chandrasena was impressed by Walpola's ability to sing and after auditioning several songs with harmonium accompaniment, sent a good word to the Radio Ceylon broadcaster Thevis Guruge. Guruge gave Walpola a sarala gee programme with a duet partner G. S. B. Rani Perera.

Playback singing (1953-1965)
Walpola debuted as a playback singer in the 1953 film Prema Tharangaya alongside his future wife Rita Jenevi Fernando.  Around 1956, Walpola married Fernando who subsequently adapted the name Latha Walpola. From his debut to the early 1960s, Walpola dominated male playback singing in Sri Lankan cinema providing a counterpoint to the harsh Carnatic style of Mohideen Baig with his softer more melodic voice which lend itself to love songs. His best known work from this period include "Seeya Manamalaya" from Asoka (1955), "Amu Pitisareyeki" from Seda Sulang (1955), "Upatha Labaa" and "Suba Aasiri (Hanika Yamang)" from Mathalang (1955), "Surathalee" from Surathalee (1956), "Katey Kiri Suwanda" from Sandesaya (1960), "Oya Belma" and "Waththe Wetunu Pol Athu" from Kurulu Bedda (1961) and "Man Mula Wela" from Deepashika (1963).

Walpola's dueting partners included Vivienne de Silva Boralessa, Chitra Somapala ("Pem Suwandai") and Rukmani Devi in addition to Latha.

Later life 
Walpola successfully returned to Radio Ceylon with "Uthama Muni Dalada" (lyrics by Ajantha Ranasinghe and music by Sanath Nandasiri.)

Walpola served as a music teacher later on in his life. He died on December 25, 1983.

Personal life 
Dharmadasa Walpola is married Latha Walpola and has five children                                                                                                                                                                                   Amith Walpola, Dhammika Walpola, Chaminda Lolitha Walpola, Suneth Walpola, Sumith Walpola, have already entered the music industry

Children
Geethan Bandara, Thisara Bandara, Mayura Bandara, have already entered the music industry

Dharmadasa Walpola – Golden Voice of the Silver Screen 

By T. K. Premadasa

''(The writer is the retired former Head of Corporate Affairs and Communications - Sri Lanka Export Development Board. )'

Dharmadasa Walpola incontrovertibly dominated the Sinhala Cinema in 1950s & 60s as the best play-back singer. The melodious and romantic voice of Dharmadasa Walpola, a household name, resonates even today in the hearts of music fans over the island. This is a commemorative appreciation of the 30th Death Anniversary of this versatile musician on December 25, 2013.

Born on 27 November 1927 in Deiyannewela, Kandy, this future play-back singer displayed his innate talents of musical virtuosity since his boyhood. His mother was Mrs Karunawathie and father Mr Charles Appuhamy, a dressmaker by profession, tailored costumes to the Tower Hall artists. His father’s close association with them paved way for him to know the leading artists on the stage. By 7 years of age he started singing Nadagam songs and his father took him for support work behind the stage. Acquaintance with Tower Hall staff opened the rare opportunity of playing a character on the stage. Later he played the main role of Prince Dhanapala in Samudra Devi. He displayed his skills in "Amma", the stage-play produced by Veteran Producer/Director Sirisena Wimalaweera, reciting Virudu gayana.  In "Wessanthara" he availed of the opportunity to show his colors on the stage.

Influenced by Mr. Jamis Perera from Kandy, Dharmadasa turned to music furthering his talents under Musicians Lionel Perera, Eddie Master and R.A.Chandrasena. He mastered the flute as his favorite instrument.  In early 1950s he joined Radio Ceylon orchestra. He was a superb player of harmonium, violin, tabla and flute. It lends high degree of credence to M. Ariyadasa, tablist who encouraged Dharmadasa with fullest support to succeed in his musical career.

Mr.Thevis Guruge, the then Director of Radio Ceylon, opened the opportunity for him to display his inborn talents of singing in Sarala Gee Program broadcast by Radio Ceylon. Dharmadasa joined popular Radio Artist G. S. B. Rani Perera in her Sarala Gee Program to sing his first duet, the favorite song "Thotiyo thotiyo" in 1951. Since then he became a popular artist with many number of solos and the most popular duet "Nidi Yahane Aida" recorded with Vivienne de Silva Boralessa. His first solo is " Asaray Prema Sepatha"  song on Buddhist values.

Dharmadasa acclaimed zenith of his popularity overnight as a play-back singer by his first film "Prema Tharangaya" screened in 1953. "Honda hondama weya lowa kisima thenaka nehe" a highly popular duet for decades was sung with (Latha) Rita Jenavi Fernando who later became Latha Walpola by marriage to Dharmadasa.  An interesting story heard about his entry to play-back singing is worthy of mention.

Aruna Shanthi who played the main role in Prema Tharangaya was scheduled to sing this song. But a difficult situation arose since Aruna Shanthi failed to satisfy the required quality of singing. At this decisive moment, M. Ariyadasa of the orchestra voluntarily rushed to Dharmadasa’s home, brought him in the midnight and introduced him to the Producers. This made a landmark of his musical career with his adorable voice to become a popular play-back singer overnight.

He sang for films in Sujatha as second film followed by Ahankara Sthree. Contribution of his scintillating voice to over 120 films during a period of thirty years from 1952 to 1983 was remarkable. Mathalang, Surathalee, Sukomali, Surangani, Asoka, Suhada Sohoyuro, Suraya, Surasena, Sundara Birida, Sithala Watura, Deevaraya, Veera Vijaya, Radala Piliruwa and Dostara (Doctor) were a few among hundreds of movies that captured hearts of the people with his exhilarating voice. Unfortunately this golden voice withered away with his final song "Asha Mal Pawan" in film  "Samanmalee" released in January, 1979 to the Sinhala Cinema.

The everlasting memories of favorite hits like ‘Mae Saumya Rathri’ in Sirimali, "Satnaki Jeevithe" in Asoka  ‘Oya Belma Oya Kelma in Kurulu Bedda, Kate Kiri Suwanda in Sandesaya, Mangalad dinye in Sithal Watura Jeevithe Jeevethe in Kolaba Hadayo will be etched in the minds for another millennium. Kavi gayana in Dingiri Menika, Kurulu Bedda  has influenced the listeners with highest admiration even today. He was also the play-back singer not only for leading Sri Lankan actors like Gamini Fonseka, Joe Abeywickrama,  Ananda Jayaratne, Herbi Senavitratna, Roy De Silva et al, but also Indian actors like Jemini Ganeshan.

The songs recorded by this great play-back singer in Jeevithaya and Samanalayo are highly popular even today though the two films were never screened. The song "Kowlan  Handaine" and "Amba Damba Sevanali" sung  with Sydney Attigala for the film "Jeevithaya" are still a hot favorite among the public.

As far back as the latter part of 1950s and 1960s dubbing Sinhala dialogue into Hindi and Tamil movies became highly popular with fully packed audience. Dharmadasa Walpola was adjudged the best play-back singer for his pre-eminent golden voice over the world acclaimed Indian singers. Pathiwatha, Veeravikrama, Ahinsaka Prayogya, Angulimala, Sudu Nangi, Ley Kandulu, Shimbo, and Anjalee are clear testimony to his masterly vocal performance.
  
Initially, since film industry in Sri Lanka was not equipped with technical resources, producers were compelled to go to South India in early 1950s to film their production. This prompted them to hire Indian singers at a lower charge. But Latha Walpola and Dharmadasa Walpola broke the South Indian monopoly and became indomitable duo in Sinhala Cinema.

Dharmadasa Walpola was not only the leading play-back singer but also the indisputable singer in ballet radio and stage drama music. His masterly performance of singing in Bari Sil, Kela Mal and Nawarella, famous ballet music composed by Musician Dr Premasiri Khemadasa captured the fully packed spell bound audience at every presentation.  Seegiri Gala Musapath Kala and " Sirikatha Ena Maga" are  highly popular songs even today as well as the lovely song Uttama Muni Dalada Balan Saki from Dalada Watha Radio Drama  lyrics by Dr Ajantha Ranasinghe and melody by Prof. Sanath Nandasiri.

In addition to play-back singing Dharmadasa sang for HMV and Columbia Records. It was a privilege to sing for both those commercial branding labels at the time.  Among the songs recorded were "Sansare Duka Nesu Shakya Raja", "Ananda Javanika", "Ase Gethe Madura Geethe" with Rukmani Devi,  "Sri Lankave  Shantha Sobana", "Dakina Dakina Wele", "Manike Manike Run kande", "Suwanda Gange Adere Ape" with Latha and solo like "Me Prema Kathawe" These  songs became highly popular overnight.

He shared his golden voice with Latha, G.S.B.Rani Perera, Rukmani Devi, Viviene de Silva Boralessa, Chitra Somapala, Nanda Malini, Sujatha Aththanayake, Jikki, K. Jamuna Rani et al. He has sung under the directors Mohammed Gausse, R. Mutthusami, B. S. Perera, Sunil Shantha, R. A. Chandrasena, P. L. A. Somapala, Premasiri Khemadasa, Sarath Dassanayake and Sanath Nandasiri. Also he recorded songs under the direction of famous Indian musicians as Dakshina Murthi, S. S. Weda, T. R. Papa, R. Sundaram, Raja Thangendra, Gowradanam and Jayadev. In the 1960s and 1970s he conducted Dharmadasa Sangeethayathanaya, School of Music in Maradana.

He married (Latha) Rita Jenevi Fernando of Galkissa in 1959, the Nightingale of Sri Lanka. A ceremonial wedding was held at Siri Kotha, Kollupitiya with a huge gathering of guests and artists. Policemen had to be deployed to control the massive crowd gathered outside Siri Kotha. They have three sons and a daughter.

His fans and friends, including Vernan De Silva, organised a Commemorative Death Anniversary Celebration in Kandy as a tribute to this versatile play-back singer with meritorious deeds of blood donation program, Sangika Dana, launch of a book written on Dharmadasa’s biography and issue a commemorative stamp to coincide with the thirtieth anniversary of his death.

Dharmadasa Walpola was a gentleman who strictly adhered to his principle of safeguarding the dignity of singing despite it might have caused disadvantage to him. However, the bold decision taken by him has benefitted the future generation involved in music to maintain the distinction of their musical career. In spite of his inestimable contribution of musical brilliancy, he was never recognized with awards except a limited number of articles written particularly in English media. This article is an attempt to reminisce with honor the immeasurable contribution made by him to national music. It behooves all Sri Lankans to salute this great musician as a mark of gratefulness in recognition of his musical excellence to the nation..

References

External links 
 Darmadasa Walpola's page on Miyuru Gee
 Dharmadasa Walpola's page on Sinhala Jukebox
 Dharmadasa Walpola - ධර්මදාස වල්පොල - Siyapath Arana - සියපත් අරණ
 තාත්තගෙයි, ධර්මදාස වල්පොලගෙයි වෙනස මට වැටහුණේ ඔහුගේ අවමඟුල දා...

Tamil playback singers
1927 births
1983 deaths
20th-century Sri Lankan male singers
Sinhalese singers